Cosimo Andrea Figliomeni (born 7 October 1992) is an Italian football forward who plays for Gioiosa Jonica. From 2014 until 2016 he had his only experience outside Italy playing in Romania for Gaz Metan Mediaș, in the first season he played in Liga I and the second in Liga II.

Honours
Gaz Metan Mediaș
Liga II: 2015–16

References

1992 births
Living people
Italian footballers
Association football forwards
Liga I players
Liga II players
A.S.D. Roccella players
U.S. Catanzaro 1929 players
U.S. Vibonese Calcio players
CS Gaz Metan Mediaș players
Italian expatriate footballers
Expatriate footballers in Romania
Italian expatriate sportspeople in Romania
People from Locri
Footballers from Calabria
Sportspeople from the Metropolitan City of Reggio Calabria